Tarah Paige Chellevold (born July 8, 1982) is an American gymnast, dancer and actress.

Biography
Daughter of Duane Chellevold and wife Hertha Jane Farmer and sister of Devon ... Chellevold, paternal granddaughter of Norman Chellewold then Chellevold (b. Wisconsin, son of Ole Chellewold (b. Norway, Sweden-Norway) and wife Dorthea Tangedahl then Dorothea Tangadal (b. Norway, Sweden-Norway)) and wife Helen Brown and maternal granddaughter of Arvel Lewis Farmer (son of Noah Lewis Farmer and wife Lelah/Lela Mae Brown and paternal grandson of H. G. Farmer and wife Mary ...) and wife Hertha Fredericka Hedwig Steiner (b. Missouri, daughter of Otto Steiner (b. Germany, son of parents b. Switzerland) and wife Emma Heideman (b. Germany, daughter of parents b. Germany)).

She has played minor and supporting roles in various television shows and movies, including Malcolm in the Middle, A Cinderella Story, Stick It, Bring It On: All or Nothing, and The Summoning. As a gymnast, she won the bronze medal on the balance beam at 2001 Nationals.

On the ABC Family Channel show Make It or Break It (2009–2012) Tarah worked as the gymnastics coordinator.

Filmography

External links
 
 

1982 births
Living people
Actresses from Phoenix, Arizona
American child actresses
American female dancers
American dancers
American gymnasts
21st-century American women